48Hours is a New Zealand film-making competition. It involves teams of various sizes competing to write, shoot, edit and score a short film, which must be between 1 and 5 minutes long (7 minutes before 2016), over a single 48-hour period. Developed from the US-based 48 Hour Film Project, which was run in Auckland in 2003, 48Hours has been running as a New Zealand-only event since 2004. with regional competitions organised in 8 cities around New Zealand: Auckland, Hamilton, Gisborne, Rotorua, Taranaki, Wellington, Christchurch and Dunedin.

The event was founded by Anthony "Ant" Timpson and is organised by Ness Patea and Ruth Korver. There is a launch event on Friday night of the shoot weekend, where each team is given a randomly selected genre. They are also given three compulsory elements which are common to all teams. These are a line of dialogue, a prop, a character, and since 2010, a "technical" element.

All creative work required to produce the film must be undertaken and completed within the 48 hours of the competition. This includes storylining, scriptwriting, filming, editing and audio mixing. Teams must deliver their finished film to the competition organisers by the Sunday evening to be eligible for prizes, although late deliveries will still be screened in the heats.

By 2011 the competition had grown to include more than 800 teams nationwide with at least 10,000 people believed to be involved. In 2020, there was a free lockdown version of the competition which was run in level 4. There were 1208 films created over one weekend.

Compulsory elements 

Every year teams are given a number of compulsory elements to help ensure that film has been wholly created on the shoot weekend. The elements include a character with a gender-neutral name, a character trait, a line of dialogue, a prop, and as of 2010, a technical shot. As well as these, teams are randomly allocated a genre for their film. 2017 saw the introduction of themes, different elements, and the ULTRA48 Challenge for teams that elect to do it for added difficulty.

Genres by year

Regional and national winners

After initially being held in Auckland in 2003 as part of the international 48 Hour Film Project, the independent 48Hours began in 2004 with teams in Auckland and Wellington. At its peak in 2011, it was represented in eight cities.

 2003

 Auckland: Special Crime Unit - Lazy Racer Angela Adams

 2004

 Auckland: Jesse McLeod: The Journey - Classic
 Wellington: Heinous Crime - The Circus

 2005

 Auckland: A Fairly Good Tale - Crash Zoom
 Wellington: Chip & Manny - Locked And Stapled
 Christchurch: Bruised Gold - Evil Genius Labs
 Dunedin: Mosgiel Tonight - Jo Seager Megadrive
 National Runner-Up: Bruised Gold - Evil Genius Labs (Christchurch)
 National Winner: A Fairly Good Tale - Crash Zoom (Auckland)

 2006

 Auckland: Brown Peril - The Tim Porch Story - thedownlowconcept
 Wellington: The Baby Farmer - Clean Slate
 Christchurch: The Escort - FR7835
 Dunedin: Action At Both Ends - Daddy Cool
 Hamilton: Robin Slade - Time Tourist - Dance Donkee Dance
 National Runner-Up: Slade In Full - White Tiger (Wellington)
 National Winner: Brown Peril - The Tim Porch Story - thedownlowconcept (Auckland)

 2007

 Auckland: Camp Fear - Mukpuddy
 Wellington: Maori Detective and the Boogie Fever - Good Times
 Christchurch: Carboys and the Indian - The Outwits
 Dunedin: Bain: The Musical - Burt Hall Banana Republic
 Hamilton: The Playground - Taktix Films
 Gisborne: One Man's War - Cuzzie Films
 National Runner-Up: Carboys and the Indian - The Outwits (Christchurch)
 National Winner: Lease - Lense Flare (Auckland)

 2008

 Auckland: The End - Fractured Radius
 Wellington: Darlene - Smashing Pants
 Christchurch: Agent Post - Spooce Media/The Real McCoy
 Dunedin: Two Bodies, One Night - The Dangly Gruffnuts
 Hamilton: Sum of the parts - Guerrilla Monkeys
 Gisborne: Le dernier jour de Tony - Kaiti Hill
 National Runner-Up: Beyond Belief - Lense Flare (Auckland)
 National Winner: F* Dance - Puppy Guts (Wellington)

 2009

 Auckland: Nature's Baby - Sinistral
 Wellington: Otack Otack Otack Fall - Killah Walz/Orca
 Christchurch: New Fish - TBALC
 Dunedin: Charlotte - Line Men
 Hamilton: Hardwood Floors - Guerrilla Monkeys
 Gisborne: The Amazing World of Sticks - Kaiti Hill
 National Runner-Up: New Fish - TBALC (Christchurch)
 National Winner: Charlotte - Line Men (Dunedin)

 2010

 Auckland: Only Son - thedownlowconcept
 Wellington: Balls & Chain - Dog Films
 Christchurch: Death in the West - Gorilla Team Gorilla
 Dunedin: The Stag Do - Mirage Videos
 Hamilton: Gone - Reel Good People
 Gisborne: A Toy Car named Sidney - 2 Many Darkies
 Taranaki: Hopping Away - Ivan Goff Fan Club
 National Third Place: The Pool - Winlove Adventure Brothers (Auckland)
 National Runner-Up: Confessions of a Fabricator - IdiotVision (Auckland)
 National Winner: Only Son - thedownlowconcept (Auckland)

 2011

 Auckland: The Child Jumpers - Grand Cheval
 Wellington: Sketch - Couch Kumaras
 Christchurch: Naughty Man - SuspectTV
 Dunedin: Chatter - Rabies Babies
 Hamilton: Kingdom Of Shadow - Arthouse Massacre
 Gisborne: FAD Town - Cuzzie Films
 Taranaki: Well Strung - Rubber Soul Productions
 National Third Place: Meanie Pants - MukPuddy (Auckland)
 National Runner-Up: Copy That - Lense Flare (Auckland)
 National Winner: The Child Jumpers - Grand Cheval (Auckland)

 2012

 Auckland: The Girl With The Clover Tattoo - Lense Flare
 Wellington: Brains? - Noise and Pictures
 Christchurch: An Inconvenient Hoof - Picton Pictures
 Dunedin: Do the Knight Thang - Flim Flom Films
 Hamilton: Dead Lucky - Tuff Collective
 National Third Place: Love in Decay - MukPuddy (Auckland)
 National Runner-Up: The Girl With The Clover Tattoo - Lense Flare (Auckland)
 National Winner: Brains? - Noise and Pictures (Wellington)

 2013

 Auckland: Sleep Clinic - dr jeckyll
 Wellington: The Sleeping Plot - Traces of Nut
 Christchurch: Is Love Enough? - The Eh Team
 Dunedin: We Run The Night - SML Productions
 Hamilton: The Empath - Elysium Exit
 Gisborne: Bungy - Kaiti Hill
 Taranaki: Partners in Crime - Rubber Soul
 National Third Place: Autocraniotomous - NightOwls (Auckland)
 National Runner-Up: I Got Robots - Chess Club (Auckland)
 National Winner: The Sleeping Plot - Traces of Nut (Wellington)

 2014
 Auckland: Dead End Job - Mukpuddy
 Wellington: Rubble - Noise and Pictures
 Christchurch: The Ex - TBALC
 Dunedin: A Right Tool - Begged, Borrowed, Stolen
 Hamilton: Feed - Hoganstreetheroes
 Gisborne: Whai utu - Kratos
 Taranaki: Travel with Time Pieces - The Tanked Engines
 National Third Place: A Lesson on Probability - Mexico (Auckland)
 National Runner-Up: Rubble - Noise and Pictures (Wellington)
 National Winner: Pants On Fire - Lense Flare (Auckland)

 2015
 Auckland: Bread Winner - Chess Club
 Wellington: Loyal - Couch Kumaras
 Christchurch: The Silent Man - TBALC
 Dunedin: 48 Days Later - Begged, Borrowed, Stolen
 Hamilton: The Specialist - CockUp Productions
 Gisborne: From - Kaiti Hill
 Taranaki: Beat Down - Camera Child
 National Third Place: Loyal - Couch Kumaras (Wellington)
 National Runner-Up: Tide - King Gains-Bury & Biches (Auckland)
 National Winner: Bread Winner - Chess Club (Auckland)

 2016
 Auckland: Ghostfish: Catfished By A Ghost - Prime Rib
 Wellington: Love.exe - Bork!
 Christchurch: Down to the Wire - TBALC Alpha 
 Dunedin: The Loom of Doctor Flowers - Super Furious Ninja Dragons 
 Hamilton: Love is a Crime - DF-10
 Gisborne: Bromancing The Stone - Team Indeed
 Taranaki: A Bro's Life - Rubber Soul Productions
 National Third Place: Love.exe - Bork! (Wellington)
 National Runner-Up: Ghostfish: Catfished By A Ghost - Prime Rib (Auckland)
 National Winner: Travel Centre - Chillybox (Auckland)

 2017
 Auckland: Under The Bridge - Cool Story Bro Film
 Wellington: Jack & Joni - Moffilaide
 Christchurch: Split Sibling Decision - Free Chicken 
 Dunedin: The Beach - Dwarf Shortage 
 Hamilton: Dude, That's Your Sister! - DF-10
 Bay of Plenty: Bonnie - The Mugshots
 Gisborne: KELVIN - Ma am
 Taranaki: Charlie Echo Alpha - Currie Street Creatives
 National Third Place: Feeding - Southern Belles (Auckland)
 National Runner-Up: A Friend For Life - Missing Pixels (Auckland)
 National Winner: Under The Bridge - Cool Story Bro Film (Auckland)

 2018
 Auckland: La Coquille - Halcyon Entertainment
 Wellington: Master - Temple of Nut
 Christchurch: Utka - Poutine Wolf 
 Dunedin: Lizard Does Earth - Watson and Cricket Productions 
 Hamilton: Glow - Taktix Films
 Bay of Plenty: Manawa Bay - Tinker Tailor
 Gisborne: The Great Great Mistake - Kratos
 Taranaki: The Story of a Decade - Through the Lens Films
 National Third Place: Red Touch Yellow - PickleThugs (Auckland)
 National Runner-Up: Hero - Blood and Bone (Christchurch)
 National Winner: PepTok - Chillybox (Auckland)

 2019
 Auckland: Like Nobody's Watching - Chillybox
 Wellington: Apollo 69 - Qualified Tim
 Christchurch: A Familiar Feeling - Snack to the Future 
 Dunedin: Big Boys - Watson and Cricket Productions 
 Hamilton: Daddio - Reneel Singh
 Bay of Plenty: Extra Time - Great Lakes Film Society
 Gisborne: The Noise Of Life - Kratos
 Taranaki: 40 Candles - Spacies Crew
 National Third Place: Toast - Missing Pixels (Auckland)
 National Runner-Up: Like Nobody's Watching - Chillybox (Auckland)
 National Winner: A Familiar Feeling - Snack to the Future (Christchurch)

 2020
2020 did not have regional finals.
 National Third Place: Pupper Paleolithic - Too Much Spare Time
 National Runner-Up: The Visible Man - The Fubbs
 National Winner: For Generations - Squint Eastwood (Wellington)

 2021
 Auckland: Unfinished Symphony - Awkward Animations
 Wellington: Good Girl - Traces of Nut
 Christchurch: The Dying Art of Cat Burglary - BAE24
 Dunedin: The Unseen - Jelly Mouth
 Hamilton: The Hitchhiker - Blink Blue Media
 Bay of Plenty: Impalpable - Temporary Estate
 Gisborne: A Job Worth Keeping - Kratos
 Taranaki: GOOD AS GOLD - Kinaki
 National Third Place: Āta - Mitchell's Here (Auckland)
 National Runner-Up: A Matter of Time - Apple Fork (Auckland)
 National Winner: Good Girl - Traces of Nut (Wellington)

 2022
 Auckland: Love You Stranger - Missing Pixels
 Wellington: A Multitude Of Ways To Leave Your Lover - Child Support
 Christchurch: Going Solo - Rabid Auntie Jean
 Dunedin: Instant Cinematic Classic - Under-Funded Thunder Films
 Hamilton: Oh Crap - RS Productions
 Bay of Plenty: Sacrifarce - Great Lake Film Society
 Gisborne: 18 To Life - Kratos
 Taranaki: Daddy Daddy - Filmanui
 National Third Place: TBD
 National Runner-Up: TBD
 National Winner: TBD

 Notes

References

External links
48Hours Official Site

Short film festivals in New Zealand
Film competitions
Recurring events established in 2004